Presidential elections were held in Mauritania on 24 January 1992. They followed the constitutional referendum the previous year that resulted in the reintroduction of multi-party democracy, and were the first presidential elections to feature more than one candidate. The result was a victory for incumbent President Maaouya Ould Sid'Ahmed Taya of the Democratic and Social Republican Party, who defeated three other candidates with 62.9% of the vote. Voter turnout was just 47.4%.

Results

By wilaya

References

Mauritania
1992 in Mauritania
Presidential elections in Mauritania
January 1992 events in Africa